Sonevilay Sihavong (born 18 August 1996), is a Laotian footballer currently playing as a defender.

Career statistics

International

References

1996 births
Living people
Laotian footballers
Laos international footballers
Association football defenders